Edward Felix Tudor-Pole (also known as Edward Tenpole; born 6 December 1955) is an English musician, television presenter and actor.

Originally gaining fame in the United Kingdom in the late 1970s as the lead singer of the punk rock band Tenpole Tudor, Tudor-Pole began an acting career following the group's split in 1982. Outside of his music career Tudor-Pole is probably best known in the UK as the presenter of the game show The Crystal Maze from 1993 to 1995 and in the US for his roles as Enaros in the 1997 fantasy film Kull the Conqueror and Mr Borgin in the Harry Potter film series.

Personal life
Tudor-Pole was born on 6 December 1955 in Lambeth, London, to David W. and Shirley C. (née Brown) Tudor-Pole. The family's name derives from that of John de la Pole, 2nd Duke of Suffolk (great-grandson of Geoffrey Chaucer), via Tudor-Pole's grandfather, spiritualist Wellesley Tudor Pole. Wellesley's mother was a descendant of Welsh courtier Owen Tudor, and added the 'Tudor' to her son's name.

Tudor-Pole was educated at Pennthorpe School, Rudgwick, Sussex and King Edward's School in Witley, Surrey. He later attended the Royal Academy of Dramatic Art. He lives in London and has one son. He was a keen biker for many years; his motorcycling skills can be witnessed in the 1997 film Tunnel of Love, in which he played the lead role of Dodge.

Musical career
Tudor-Pole formed the band Tenpole Tudor in 1977, and eventually came to prominence after appearing in the film The Great Rock 'n' Roll Swindle as a possible replacement for Johnny Rotten in the Sex Pistols. He sang "Who Killed Bambi?", "The Great Rock 'n' Roll Swindle" and a cover version of "Rock Around the Clock" in the film and on the soundtrack. Tenpole Tudor returned in 1980, signing to Stiff Records and releasing two successful albums, Eddie, Old Bob, Dick and Gary and Let the Four Winds Blow. They had three hit singles, including UK Top 10 hit "Swords of a Thousand Men" which he performed on Top of the Pops in May 1981.

Acting career
Tudor-Pole has appeared in numerous films and plays, and was the presenter on The Crystal Maze, replacing Richard O'Brien from 1993 until the show's hiatus in 1995. He appeared in Between the Lines in 1992, playing a Liverpudlian villain. His film and play credits include The Rocky Horror Show (written by his Crystal Maze predecessor), Jim Cartwright's play Road at the Royal Court Theatre, The Great Rock 'n' Roll Swindle (1980), Absolute Beginners (1986), Drowning by Numbers (1988), White Hunter Black Heart (1990) with Clint Eastwood, Princess Caraboo (1994), and several films by Alex Cox including Sid and Nancy (1986), Straight to Hell (1987) and Walker (1987).

In Kull the Conqueror (1997) he played Enaros, the antagonist of the film. The following year he appeared as a slumlord in the film version of Les Misérables, and as a blind man in Russell Mulcahy's horror film Tale of the Mummy. He also was seen in Quills (2000), The Life and Death of Peter Sellers (2004) as Spike Milligan, and The Queen's Sister (2005). Most recently he had a small part in an episode of Agatha Christie's Marple entitled "A Pocket Full of Rye", shown in 2009. His appearance in Harry Potter and the Chamber of Secrets (2002) as Mr Borgin, the owner of Borgin and Burke's store, was cut from the theatrical release, but is included in the extended edition DVD. He also appeared as a ranting street preacher in season two of Game of Thrones.

Filmography

References

External links

1955 births
Living people
People educated at King Edward's School, Witley
English male singers
English punk rock singers
English television presenters
Sex Pistols
English male film actors
English male stage actors
Male actors from London
20th-century English male actors
21st-century English male actors
Alumni of RADA